The Murchison Fund is an award given by the Geological Society of London to researchers under the age of 40 who have contributed substantially to the study of hard rock and tectonic geology. It is named in honour of Prof. Roderick Impey Murchison.

Recipients
Source: Murchison Fund, The Geological Society

See also

 List of geology awards
 Murchison Medal
 Prizes named after people

References

 2006 awards at Durham University
 1998 awards at Geotimes
 1987 award at UCL

Geology awards
Awards of the Geological Society of London
Awards established in 1873
British science and technology awards
1873 establishments in the United Kingdom